Chittaranjan Das Thakur (died 8 November 2021) was an Indian politician and leader of Communist Party of India. He represented Panskura Paschim constituency from 1996 to 2011.

References

2021 deaths
20th-century births
Communist Party of India politicians from West Bengal
People from Purba Medinipur district